This is a list of women photographers who were born in the United States or whose works are closely associated with that country.

A
 Kathryn Abbe (1919–2014), worked for Vogue in the early 1940s, later freelance, subject include children, musicians and actors
 Berenice Abbott (1898–1991), black and white photography of New York's architecture in the 1930s, part of the straight photography movement
Esther Henderson Abbott (1911–2008), first woman photographer for Arizona Highways Magazine
 Harriet Chalmers Adams (1875–1937), explorer whose expedition photographs were published in National Geographic
 Marian Hooper Adams (1843–1885), early portrait photographer, also local landscapes
 Lynsey Addario (born 1973), photojournalist often focusing on the role of women in traditional societies
 Laura Aguilar (1959–2018), strong feminist focus
Lili Almog (born 1961), Israeli-American photographer, work includes nuns and Chinese Muslims
 Joan Almond (1935–2021), black and white photographer who prints her own works
 Nina Alovert (born 1935), Russian-American ballet photographer, writer
 Sama Raena Alshaibi (born 1973), see Palestine
 Jane Fulton Alt (born 1951), documented Hurricane Katrina
 Ruth Matilda Anderson (1893 – 1983) documented rural life in early 20th-century Spain.
 Nancy Lee Andrews (born 1947), fashion, music covers
 Yvette Borup Andrews (1891–1959), photographed Central Asia for the American Museum of Natural History
 Eleanor Antin (born 1935), also works with video, film, performance and drawing
 Amy Arbus (born 1954), a New York City–based photographer
 Diane Arbus (1923–1971), black and white photographs of deviant and marginal people
 Laura Adams Armer (1874–1963), portraiture in San Francisco, images of the Navajo
 Eve Arnold (1913–2012), photojournalist with Magnum Photos
 Kristen Ashburn (born 1973), photojournalist covering AIDS in southern Africa, tuberculosis and Hurricane Katrina
 Jane Evelyn Atwood (born 1947), documentary photographer living in Paris
 Ellen Auerbach (1906–2004), German-born Jewish immigrant, remembered for pre-war work in her Berlin studio
 Alice Austen (1866–1952), from Staten Island, producing some 8,000 photographs from 1884
 Elizabeth Axtman (born 1980), emphasis on race in American culture

B
 Susan Ford Bales (born 1957), photojournalist, daughter of President Gerald Ford
 Catharine Weed Barnes (1851–1913), early female editor of photographic journals, strong supporter of women photographers
 Tina Barney (born 1945), large-scale portraits of family and friends
 Martine Barrat (date of birth unknown), see France
 Ruth-Marion Baruch (1922–1997), series on the Black Panthers and the San Francisco Bay area
 Lillian Bassman (1917–2012), early fashion photographer for Harper's Bazaar
Erica Baum (born 1961), New York photographer using printed paper and language as subject
 Jessie Tarbox Beals (1870–1942), born in Canada, first published female photojournalist in the United States
 Carol Beckwith (born 1945), photographer of the indigenous tribal cultures of Africa
 Vanessa Beecroft (born 1969), see Italy
 Jamie Beck (born 1983)
 Zaida Ben-Yusuf (1869–1933), portraits of notable Americans at the turn of the 19th–20th century, portrait gallery in New York from 1897
 Lynne Bentley-Kemp (born 1952), fine arts photographer, photography educator, and researcher
 Berry Berenson (1948–2001), freelance photographer publishing in Life, Glamour, Vogue and Newsweek
 Nina Berman (born 1960), documentary photographer, military focus
 Ruth Bernhard (1905–2006), nude photography of women and commercial photography in Hollywood
 Edyth Carter Beveridge (c.1862 – 1927), photojournalist
 Ania Bien (born 1946), Polish-American photographer now in Amsterdam, focus on discrimination and refugees
 Joan E. Biren (born 1944), focus on lesbians and feminism
 Nadine Blacklock (1953–1998), nature photographer around Lake Superior
 Julie Blackmon (born 1966), children and family life
 Andrea Blanch (born 1946), portraits of celebrities, especially Italian men
 Lucienne Bloch (1909–1999), Swiss-born American artist and photographer, remembered for association with Diego Rivera
 Gay Block (born 1942), portrait photographer of Jewish life in Texas, Miami Beach, and Christian Rescuers from WWII; has published several photobooks
 Debra Bloomfield (born 1952), has worked in landscape since 1989; recent work has been described as "reflective activism"
 Thérèse Bonney (1894–1978), photojournalist remembered for her images of the Russian-Finnish front in World War II
 Meghan Boody (born 1964), surrealist photographer
 Andrea Booher, FEMA photographer
 Nancy Borowick (born 1985), family and social issues
 Barbara Bosworth (born 1953), American artist, photographer. Bosworth works primarily with a large-format, 8x10 view camera and focuses on the relationship between humans and nature.
 Alice Boughton (c. 1867 – 1943), theatrical portraits, worked with Gertrude Käsebier, member of the Photo-Secession movement
 Margaret Bourke-White (1906–1971), first foreigner to photograph Soviet industry, first female war correspondent and first woman photographer for Life
 Louise Arner Boyd (1887–1972), explorer who took hundreds of photographs of the Arctic, detailed photographic documentation of Poland in 1934
 Louise Boyle (1910–2005), documented African-American farm workers in Arkansas during the Great Depression
 Marilyn Bridges (born 1948), ancient sites around the world
 Deborah Bright (born 1950), is an American photographer, writer, professor, and painter specializing in critical landscape photography and queer photography and painting
 Sheila Pree Bright (born 1967), fine art photographer whose work includes documentary photographic "visual essays" and portraiture.
 Anne Brigman (1869–1950), one of the original members of the Photo-Secession movement, images of nude women (including self-portraits) from 1900 to 1920
 Charlotte Brooks (1918–2014), photojournalist, staff photographer for Look
 Ellen Brooks (born 1946), pro-filmic approach, often photographing through screens
 Kate Brooks (born 1977), photojournalist specializing in the Middle East, Afghanistan and Pakistan
 Adrien Broom (born 1980), fashion and fine art photographer specializing in images of young women
 Zoe Lowenthal Brown (1927–2022), fine art photography, documentary photographic "visual essays", and portraiture.
 Esther Bubley (1921–1998), expressive photos of ordinary people, later specializing in children in hospitals and other medical themes
 Sonja Bullaty (1923–2000), photojournalist and landscape photographer
 Elizabeth Buehrmann (c. 1886 – c. 1963), pioneer of home portraits
 Shirley Burman (born 1934), women in railroad history
 Eleanor Butler Alexander-Roosevelt (1888–1960), images of dignitaries, travel photos of Europe and Asia

C
 Victoria Cabezas (born 1950), conceptual artist, photographer
 Evelyn Cameron (1868–1928), British born photographer who moved to Terry, Montana where she documented everyday life in the Old West
 Angela Cappetta, American photographer
 Ellen Carey (born 1952), abstract photographer 
 Marion Carpenter (1920–2002), the first female national press photographer and the first woman to cover the White House
 Elinor Carucci (born 1971), an Israeli-American who has exhibited widely since 1997 and now teaches photography in New York City
 Joan Cassis (1952–1996), portrait photographer
 Dickey Chapelle (1919–1965), photojournalist known for her work as a war correspondent in World War II and the Vietnam War
 Talia Chetrit (born 1982), still life and nude photographer
 Rose Clark (1852–1942), pictorialist photographer
 Lynne Cohen (1944–2014), large prints of domestic and institutional interiors, now lives in Montreal
 Carolyn Cole (born 1961), staff photographer for the Los Angeles Times
Anne Collier (born 1970), is an American visual artist working with appropriated photographic images.
 Marjory Collins (1912–1985), photojournalist, covered the home front during World War II
 Nancy Ford Cones (1869–1962), early photographer from Loveland, Ohio, where she documented country life
Lois Conner (born 1951), noted particularly for her platinum print landscapes that she produces with a 7" x 17" format banquet camera
 Linda Connor (born 1944), spiritual locations
 Marjorie Content (1895–1984), Native Americans
 Martha Cooper (born 1940s), staff photographer from the New York Post in the 1970s
 Deborah Copaken (born 1966), photojournalist
 Kate Cordsen (born 1966), known for large format landscapes
 Tee Corinne (1943–2006), lesbian photographer
 Marie Cosindas (1925–2017), still life and color portraits, one of the first the exhibit color photographs at MoMA
 Honey Lee Cottrell (1946–2015), lesbian photographer, known for her work in On Our Backs
 Rachel Cox, (born 1984), documentary, known for work that deals with death and grieving
 Renée Cox (born 1960), Jamaican-born politically motivated photographer
 Susan Crocker (born 1940), photographer documenting urban environment
 Imogen Cunningham (1883–1976), known for her botanical photography, nudes and industrial landscapes

D
 Louise Dahl-Wolfe (1895–1989), fashion photographer for Harper's Bazaar
 Deborah Dancy (born 1949), African-American painter, photographer, mixed media artist
 Judy Dater (born 1941), best known for her book Imogen and Twinka about the photographer Imogen Cunningham
 Diana Davies (born 1938), graphic artist and photojournalist
 Lynn Davis (born 1944), large-scale black-and-white photographs specializing in monumental landscapes and architecture
 Liliane de Cock (1939–2013), Belgian-American photographer, Guggenheim fellow
 Perla de Leon (born 1952), New York based photographer
 Mary Devens (1857–1920), prominent pictorial photographer of the early 20th century
 Maggie Diaz (1925–2016), see Australia
 Jessica Dimmock (born 1978), documentary photographer, covered drug addicts in New York over eight years
 Carolyn Drake (born 1971), documentary photographer, particularly of central Asia
 Barbara DuMetz (born 1947), pioneering African-American commercial photographer
 Jeanne Dunning (born 1960), photographer of the human body

E
 Susan Eakins (1851–1938), artist and photographer, wife of Thomas Eakins, maintained her own studio using photography as a basis for her art
 Sarah J. Eddy (1851–1945), photographer of the 19th century early - 20th century, portraiture, home scenes, specializes in animals (especially cats)
 Dorothy Meigs Eidlitz (1891–1976), photographer, arts patron and women's rights advocate
 Melanie Einzig (born 1967), street photographer
 Sandra Eisert (born 1952), first White House picture editor in 1974
 Cynthia Elbaum (1966–1994), photojournalist killed while working in Chechnya
 Amy Elkins (born 1979)
 Chansonetta Stanley Emmons (1858–1937), photographer of domestic life and New England rural landscape
 Jill Enfield (born 1954), hand coloring artist best known for her work in alternative photographic processes
 Marion Ettlinger (born 1949), author portraits for book jackets

F
 Mary Anne Fackelman-Miner (born c. 1947), photojournalist and first female White House photographer
 Emma Justine Farnsworth (1860–1952), photographer whose works were displayed at the World's Columbian Exposition (1893) and the Paris Exposition (1900)
 Delphine Fawundu (born 1971), Brooklyn-born photographer and visual artist
 Anne Fishbein (born 1958), Chicago-born photographer
 Deanne Fitzmaurice (born 1957), photojournalist, winner of the Pulitzer Prize for Feature Photography in 2005
 Trude Fleischmann (1895–1990), see Austria
 Mollie Fly (1847–1925), early Arizona photographer
 Mary Lou Foy (born 1944), picture editor at the Washington Post
 Catriona Fraser (born 1972), Washington, DC based photographer and art dealer
 Jona Frank (born 1966), has made work about youth culture
 Mary Frey (born 1948)
 Jill Freedman (1939–2019), New York–based documentary photographer, known for photographs of firefighters, street cops, circus life
 Toni Frissell (1907–1988), fashion photography, World War II photographs
 Eva Fuka (1927–2015), Czech-American, she is known for her melancholic works and surreal effects

G
 Louisa Bernie Gallaher (1858–1917), scientific photographer and Smithsonian Institute's first female photographer 
 Helen K. Garber (born 1954), black and white city landscapes
 Gretchen Garner (1939–2017), photographer and mixed-media artist
 Helen Gatch (1862–1942), depicted family members and views of the Oregon coast
 E. Jane Gay (1830–1919), best known for photographing the Nez Perce
 Lynn Geesaman (1938–2020), landscape photographer
 Emme Gerhard (1872–1946), worked with her sister Mayme in St. Louis, images of Native Americans and other ethnic groups
 Mayme Gerhard (1876–1955), worked with her sister Emme in St. Louis, images of Native Americans and other ethnic groups
 Wilda Gerideau-Squires (born 1946), fine art photographer
 Paola Gianturco (born 1939), photojournalist covering women in difficulty
 Laura Gilpin (1891–1979), Native Americans (Navajo) and Pueblo and Southwestern landscapes
 Barbara Gluck (born 1938), photojournalism, especially Vietnam
 Nan Goldin (born 1953), gay and transsexual communities, New York's hard-drug subculture, skylines
 Lynn Goldsmith (born 1948), portrait and music photographer
 Suzy Gorman (born 1962), celebrity portraits
 Karen Graffeo (born 1963), portraits, documentary
 Katy Grannan (born 1969), portraits
 Beth Green (born 1949), photojournalist
 Jill Greenberg (born 1967), portraits, covers
 Lauren Greenfield (born 1966), documentary photographer and filmmaker
 Lori Grinker (born 1957), documentary photographer, artist and filmmaker
 Jan Groover (1943–2012), large format still life photographer
 Debbie Grossman (born 1977), photographer, writer
 Caroline Gurrey (1875–1927), portraitist in Hawaii at the beginning of the 20th century, remembered for her series on mixed-race Hawaiian children
 Carol Guzy (born 1956), Pulitzer Prize–winning Washington Post photographer

H
 Gail Albert Halaban (born 1970), staged portraits
 Margaret Hall (photographer) (1876–1963), World War I photographer
 Winifred Hall Allen, African-American photographer of the Harlem Renaissance
 Karen Halverson (born 1941),  photographer
 Pauline Kruger Hamilton (1870–1919), Austrian court photographer
 Marie Hansen (1918–1969) photojournalist
 Edie Harper (1922–2010), WWII  Army Corps of Engineers photographer
 Masumi Hayashi (1945–2006), photo-collage works on topics such as Japanese internment camps, abandoned prisons, city works
 Alexandra Hedison (born 1969), abstract landscapes
 Esther Henderson (1911–2008), landscape photographer
 Diana Mara Henry (born 1948), photojournalist
Nora Herting (born 1980/81), portrait photographer
 Lena Herzog (born 1970), Russian-born documentary and fine art photographer
 Mattie Edwards Hewitt (1870–1956), architectural and landscape photographer
 Elizabeth Heyert (born 1951), experimental portraiture
 Abigail Heyman (1942–2013) was an American feminist and photojournalist, known for her 1974 book, Growing Up Female: A Personal Photo-Journal.
 Carol M. Highsmith (born 1946), architectural coverage throughout the United States
 Evelyn Hockstein, photojournalist
 Martha Holmes (1923–2006), photojournalist, staff photographer and later freelancer for Life
 Roni Horn (born 1955), explores the mutable nature of art combining photography with drawing, sculpture and installations, also notable photo books
 Whitney Hubbs (born 1977)

I
 Connie Imboden (born 1953), photographer of nudes
 Edith Irvine (1884–1949), documentary work including the San Francisco earthquake

J
 Marcey Jacobson (1911–2009), indigenous peoples of southern Mexico
 Acacia Johnson (born 1990), polar photographer
 Belle Johnson (1864–1945), portraiture, including character studies, and photographs of animals (especially cats)
 Frances Benjamin Johnston (1864–1952), early photojournalist, first woman to have a studio in Washington D.C., portraits of celebrities for magazines
 Lynn Johnson (born 1953), photojournalist
 Roz Joseph (1926–2019), took black-and-white photographs of New York City, world travels
 Sarah Louise Judd (1802–1886), early photographer in Minnesota taking daguerreotypes in 1848

K
 Consuelo Kanaga (1894–1978), portraits including African-Americans
 Gertrude Käsebier (1852–1934), very influential, strong supporter of women photographers, her work covered Native Americans, portraits, commercially very successful
 Barbara Kasten (born 1936), photograms and multicolor still lifes
 Emy Kat (born 1959), fashion, advertising
 Mary Morgan Keipp (1875–1961), art photography, African-Americans
 Marie Hartig Kendall (1854–1943), portraiture and landscapes in Connecticut
 Miru Kim (born 1981), art photography
 Helen Johns Kirtland (1890–1979), photojournalist and war correspondent, coverage of World War I
 Stacy Kranitz (born 1976)
 Barbara Kruger (born 1945), conceptual black-and-white photography
 Justine Kurland (born 1969), fine art photography

L
 Tamara Lackey, lifestyle photographer
 Sarah Ladd (1860–1927), early pictorial and landscape photographer
 Kay Lahusen (1930–2021), first openly gay photojournalist of the gay rights movement
 Wendy Sue Lamm (born 1964), photojournalist noted for her images of Palestine
 Dorothea Lange (1895–1965), documentary photographer and photojournalist, covered the Great Depression
 Gillian Laub (born 1975)
 Alma Lavenson (1897–1989), documented California's Gold Rush
 Nina Leen (died 1995), Russian-born American photographer, avid contributor to Life, remembered above all for her photographs of animals
 Adelaide Hanscom Leeson (1875–1931), early photo-illustrated books
 Annie Leibovitz (born 1949), portrait photographer, worked for Rolling Stone magazine and later Vanity Fair
 Joanne Leonard (born 1940), photography of Oakland, Ca, autobiographical and family, and collage beinginpictures.com
 Zoe Leonard (born 1961), photography of New York City, photos of the fictional Fae Richards for the film The Watermelon Woman
 Rebecca Lepkoff (1916–2014), street scenes on the Lower East Side of Manhattan in the 1940s
 Isa Leshko (born 1971), fine art photographer known for her Elderly Animals series
 Sherrie Levine (born 1947), appropriation photography
 Dina Litovsky (born 1979), subcultures, leisure and sexual politics
 Helen Levitt (1907–2009), street photography around New York City
 Jacqueline Livingston (1943–2013), women's role, sexual intimacy
 Ruth Harriet Louise (1903–1940), first woman photographer active in Hollywood, running Metro-Goldwyn-Mayer's portrait studio from 1925 to 1930
 Layla Love (born 1979), fine art photographer
 Elizabeth Gill Lui (born 1951), abstract collage

M
 Diane MacKown, portraits
 Vivian Maier (1926–2009), unknown during her lifetime, her street photographs of Chicago were first published in 2011
 Rose Mandel (1910–2002), Polish-born photographer based in Berkeley, won Guggenheim Fellowship in 1967
 Ann Mandelbaum (born 1945), artist and photographer
 Sally Mann (born 1951), large black-and-white photographs of young children, then later of landscapes suggesting decay and death
 Nancy Manter (born 1951), weather, the environment and landscape
 Lizbeth Marano (born 1950), images from Iceland, France, Italy and Spain 
 Malerie Marder (born 1971), human intimacy
 Mary Ellen Mark (1940–2015), known for photojournalism, portraits and advertising photography, also covered homelessness, drug addiction and prostitution
 Diana Markosian (born 1989), documentary/photo-essayist
Louise Martin (1911–1995), known for photographs of the Funeral of Martin Luther King Jr.
 Margrethe Mather  (1886–1952), collaborated with Edward Weston
 Jill Mathis (born 1964), works based on etymology
 Rebecca Matlock (1928–2019), images from Moscow and Czechoslovakia
 Kate Matthews (1870–1956), photographed scenes of everyday life in Pewee Valley, Kentucky, also as illustrations for Annie Fellows Johnston's The Little Colonel books
 Dona Ann McAdams (born 1954), performance photography
 Linda McCartney (1942–1998), photographed pop stars in the 1960s
 Melodie McDaniel (born 1967), celebrity portraits, fashion, advertising
 Elizabeth Parker McLachlan (born 1938), photographer, professor, writer and editor specializing in the Bury Bible
 Laura McPhee (born 1958), art photography
 Susan Meiselas (born 1948), documentary photographer working for Magnum Photos, covering human rights issues in Latin America and the Nicaraguan Revolution
 Meryl Meisler (born 1951), photographed in New York City nightclubs and residents of Bushwick, Brooklyn
 Monika Merva (born 1969), photographer and artist
 Florence Meyer (1911–1962), celebrity portrait photographer
 Sonia Handelman Meyer (1920–2022), street photographer
 Hansel Mieth (1909–1998), born in Germany, joined Life magazine in 1937 until the early 1950s, photographing the Japanese at internment camps during World War II
 Lee Miller (1907–1977), fashion photographer in Paris, war correspondent for Vogue covering the London blitz and the liberation of Paris
 Susan Mikula (born 1958), photographer and artist
 Cristina Mittermeier (born 1966), Mexican-American, known for images of indigenous people
 Lisette Model (1906–1983), born in Austria, first photographed the upper classes in Nice in 1934, later worked for PM magazine in New York, also publishing in Harper's Bazaar
 Andrea Modica (born 1960), photography professor
 Barbara Morgan  (1900–1992), photographer of modern dancers, co-founder of Aperture
 Lida Moser (1920–2014), photojournalism, documentaries and street photography, contributed to Vogue, Harper's Bazaar, Look and Esquire
 Helen Messinger Murdoch (1862–1956), pioneered the use of autochromes in travel photography

N
 Marilyn Nance (born 1953), official photographer for the North American Zone of FESTAC 77, the Second World Festival of Black and African Arts and Culture, and two-time finalist for the W. Eugene Smith Award in Humanistic Photography.
 Bea Nettles (born 1946), alternative techniques
 Lennette Newell (born 1959), animal, advertising, fashion, commercial and wildlife photography
 Carol Newsom (1946–2003), sports photojournalist with focus on tennis
 Liz Nielsen (active since 2002), traditional analogue photographer
 Lora Webb Nichols (1883–1962), photographed every day life in Wyoming
 Anne Noggle (1922–2005), a photographer after a career as an aviator, depicted the ageing process of women and as curator introduced other women photographers to the public
 Dorothy Norman (1905–1997), amateur portrait photographer

O
 Catherine Opie (born 1961), addresses documentary photography, professor of photography at UCLA
 Kei Orihara (born 1948), Japanese photographer resident in the US for several periods
 Ruth Orkin (1921–1985), photojournalist contributing to Life, Look and Ladies' Home Journal, later teaching photography in New York City
 Gina Osterloh (born 1973), photographer, conceptual artist

P
 Jean Pagliuso (born 1941), photographer of poultry and fashion
 Olivia Parker (born 1941) still-life photographer
 Marvin Breckinridge Patterson (1905–2002), photojournalist, published world travel photographs in Vogue, National Geographic, Look, Life, Town & Country, and Harper's Bazaar
 Stacy Pearsall (born 1980), military photographer, twice winner of the NPPA Military Photographer of the Year award
 Sylvia Plachy (born 1943), born in Hungary, has published photo essays and portraits in The New York Times Magazine, The Village Voice and The New Yorker, also personal coverage of Central Europe
 Mimi Plumb (born 1953)
 Anita Pollitzer (1894–1975), associated with Georgia O'Keeffe and Alfred Stieglitz
 Lucy Wallace Porter (1876–1962), architectural photographer
Greta Pratt (born 1960), known for documenting staged American history
 Melanie Pullen (born 1975), specializes in large prints (from four to ten feet) of crime scenes, specially set up using models and crew
Rosamond W. Purcell (born 1942), specializes in images of natural history

R
 Rachel Raab (born 1981), professional photographer and multimedia artist
 Joan Redmond (born 1946), photographer
 Jane Reece (1868–1961), pictorial photographer, portraits, autochromes
 Marcia Reed (born 1948), first female still photographer of the International Cinematographers Guild in 1973 and to win the Society of Operating Cameramen Lifetime Achievement Award (still photographer) in 2000.
 Andrea Star Reese (born 1952), documentary photographer, photojournalist
 Blanche Reineke (1863–1935), portrait photographer, particularly of children
 Susan Ressler (born 1949), photographer
 Nancy Rexroth (born 1946), plastic camera work
 Meghann Riepenhoff (born 1979)
 Cherie Roberts (born 1978), nude models
 Ruth Robertson (1905–1998), photojournalist remembered for her work on the Angel Falls in Venezuela, establishing them as the tallest in the world
 Ann Rosener (1914–2012), photographed home front activities for the Farm Security Administration in 1942–43
 Barbara Rosenthal (born 1948), avant-garde artist, using photography along with video, installation and digital media to achieve surreal photography
 Martha Rosler (born 1943), photographer, video artist, conceptual and installation work, also known for writing
 Judith Joy Ross (born 1946), 8x10 photographer, known for 80's east coast school portraits
 Lindsey Ross (born 1981), fine-art photographer using historical processes and techniques
 Charlotte Rosshandler (born 1943), Canadian-American photographer
 Alison Rossiter (born 1953)
 Louise Rosskam (1910–2003), documented life during the Great Depression
 Irina Rozovsky (born 1981)
 Eva Rubinstein (born 1933), intimate views of people and (often empty) interiors
 Raeanne Rubenstein (1945–2019), portrait photographer
 Julia Ann Rudolph (c. 1820 – c. 1890), studio photographer active in New York and California for over 40 years
 Liza Ryan (born 1965), film and photography installations

S
 Gulnara Samoilova (born 1964)
 Naomi Savage (1927–2005), portrait photographer
 Lynn Saville (born 1950), night time urban photographer
 Keisha Scarville (born 1975)
 Erin Schaff (born 1989), photojournalist
 Virginia Schau (1915–1989), the first woman to win the Pulitzer Prize for Photography, in 1954
Justine Schiavo-Hunt (born 1966), also known as Justine Ellement, photojournalist for The Boston Herald and The Boston Globe
 Wendi Schneider (born 1955), images of nature and wildlife printed on paper vellum with hand-applied layers of gold leaf
 Collier Schorr (born 1963), portraits of young men and women
 Sarah Choate Sears (1858–1935), portraits and still lifes from the 1890s
 Cindy Sherman (born 1954), conceptual portraits, staged photographs of herself, Untitled #96 sold for $3.89 million in 2011
 Editta Sherman (1912–2013), celebrity photographer
 Melissa Shook (1939–2020), documentary photographer, artist and educator
 Elizabeth Siegfried (born 1955), photographer of self-portraiture, photographic narrative and meditative landscapes
 Marilyn Silverstone (1929–1999), photojournalist who came to specialize in India and the Himalayas
 Kate Simon (born 1953), portrait photographer known for her photographs of famous musicians and artists
 Taryn Simon (born 1975), creator of projects involving large numbers of photographs
 Lorna Simpson (born 1960), documentary street photographer who moved into ethnic divisions and racism in the 1980s
 Sandy Skoglund (born 1946), surrealist photographer creating tableaux based on her own sets
 Dayna Smith (born 1962), photojournalist who won the 1999 World Press Photo of the Year
 Polly Smith (1908–1980), photographed life in Texas in the 1930s
 Summer A. Smith, 19th century daguerreotype photographer
 Rosalind Fox Solomon (born 1930), New York based photographer of the world, especially Peru, in square monochrome
 Camille Solyagua (born 1959) photograms photographer of plants, animals and insects
 Eve Sonneman (born 1946), artist, photographer, working in colour and black and white
 Ema Spencer (1857–1941), Newark, Ohio based amateur photographer
 Melissa Springer (born 1956), photojournalist
 Susan Hacker Stang (born 1949), alternative cameras, also academic
 Sally Stapleton (born 1957), executive photo editor at Associated Press until 2003
 Sandra Stark (born 1951)
 Nina Howell Starr (1903–2000), photographer of American roadside attractions and folk art culture, and art historian
 Maggie Steber, documentary photographer for National Geographic
 Gitel Steed (1914–1977), anthropologist, ethnological photographer
 Amy Stein (born 1970), staged views, frequently with animals
 Nellie Stockbridge (c. 1868 – 1965), early Idaho mining district photographer
 Chanell Stone (born 1992), photographer
 Zoe Strauss (born 1970), shuttered buildings, empty parking lots and vacant meeting halls in South Philadelphia
 Nancy M. Stuart, portrait photographer; photography educator and administrator
 Stephanie Pfriender Stylander (born 1960), photographer
 Rachel Sussman (born 1975), living organisms at least 2,000 years old

T
 Paulette Tavormina (born 1949), fine-art photographer
 Maggie Taylor (born 1961), artistic digital imaging
 Deanna Templeton (born 1969)
 Joyce Tenneson (born 1945), fine art photographer, often of nude or semi-nude women, with cover images on a range of periodicals including Time, Life, and Entertainment Weekly
 Paula Gately Tillman (born 1946), street photography, portraits
 Beatrice Tonnesen (1871–1958), early views of live models for advertising
 Barbara Traub, street photography, landscapes, portraits
 Ka-Man Tse (born 1981)
 Deborah Turbeville (1932–2013), fashion photographer
 Mellon Tytell (born 1945), fashion and editorial photographer, did documentary series on Haiti and portraits of figures from the Beat Generation

U
 Doris Ulmann (1884–1934), known for her portraits of craftsmen and musicians from Appalachia
 Penelope Umbrico (born 1957), known for her abstract photographs of commonplace objects

V
 Raissa Venables (born 1977), surreal interiors
 Ami Vitale (born 1971), photojournalist and documentary work, National Geographic photographer
Bernis von zur Muehlen (born 1942), fine arts photographer, notably of the male nude

W
 Elizabeth Flint Wade (1849–1915), pictorial work exhibited jointly with Rose Clark
 Barbra Walz (1950/51–1990), fashion photographer known for portraits of designers
 Eva Watson-Schütze (1867–1935), pictorial-style portraits, founding member of Photo-Secession
 Rebecca Norris Webb (born 1956)
 Carrie Mae Weems (born 1953), concerned with the problems of African Americans, often staging sets for her images
 Terri Weifenbach
 Sandra Weiner (1921–2014), Polish-American street photographer and children's book author
 Alisa Wells (1927–1987), experimental photography
 Annie Wells (born 1954), Pulitzer Prize-winning photojournalist
 Eudora Welty (1909–2001), documentary work on the rural poor in Mississippi from the early 1930s and the effects of the Great Depression
 Lily White (photographer) (1866–1944), landscape photographer, particularly of Oregon
 Myra Albert Wiggins (1869–1956), pictorial work, member of the Photo-Secession movement
 Hannah Wilke (1940–1993), performance artist and photographer
 Laura Wilson (born 1939), photographic essayist
 Deborah Willis (born 1948), curator and exhibition organizer
 Merry Moor Winnett (1951–1994), noted for experimental imagery
 Dawn Wirth (born 1960), photographer
 Sharon Wohlmuth (1946–2022), photojournalist and best-seller author
 Marion Post Wolcott (1910–1990), worked for Farm Security Administration documenting poverty during the Great Depression
 Linda Wolf (born 1950), One of the first women in rock and roll photography; early work in France covers village life, later bus benches in the United States and multicultural portraits for Los Angeles billboards
 Penny Wolin (born 1953), portraiture, visual anthropology, concerned with documenting American Jewish culture
 Francesca Woodman (1958–1981), black-and-white photographs of herself and nude female models
 Constance Philpitt Warner (1897-1992), worked with the Smithsonian National Zoo

Y
 Bunny Yeager (1929–2014) figure photographer and former pin-up model
 Yelena Yemchuk (born 1970), fashion, advertising and album photography, also videos

Z 

 Cassandra Zampini (born 1983) photographer and digital artist

See also
List of women photographers

References

 
American women photographers, List of
Photographers
Photographers